The 2015 Fórmula 4 Sudamericana Championship season is the second season of the Formula 4 Sudamericana. It began on 24 May at the Autódromo Víctor Borrat Fabini in Uruguay, and finished on 8 December at the Autódromo Internacional Ayrton Senna in Brazil, after eight rounds.

Drivers

Race calendar and results
An updated race calendar was released on 9 April 2015. On 23 June, it was announced that the fourth round was to be held at Autódromo Oscar Cabalén on 16 August, and the fifth round was to be held at Autódromo Termas de Río Hondo on 13 September. The calendar was further altered on 27 July, with the round at Autódromo Termas de Río Hondo moved back to 4 October to replace the round at Autódromo Eusebio Marcilla. The round scheduled for 13 September was moved to Autódromo Santiago Yaco Guarnieri. These three Argentinian venues would form a mini-tournament within the F4 Sudamericana called Copa Argentina. The last two rounds of the calendar were finally made public on 30 October, with the seventh round being held at the Autódromo Internacional de Cascavel on 8 November and the season-ending venue taking place at the Autódromo Internacional Ayrton Senna in Londrina on 6 December. The venue at Cascavel and the first race at Londrina will form another mini-tournament within the F4 Sudamericana called Copa Brasil, while the last race of Londrina will give double points towards the main championship.

Rounds denoted with a blue background are a part of the Copa Argentina, while rounds denoted with a light green background are a part of the Copa Brasil.

Championship standings

Points system
Points were awarded as follows:

Formula 4 Sudamericana

Copa Argentina

Copa Brasil

References

External links
 

Fórmula 4 Sudamericana seasons
Sudamericana
Formula 4